Bankston Lake is a lake in the U.S. state of Georgia.

The lake was named after R.E. Bankston, original owner of the site. A variant name was "Tama Lake".

References

Reservoirs in Georgia (U.S. state)
Bodies of water of Bibb County, Georgia